The inaugural series of Sky One comedy-drama television series Brassic began broadcasting on 22 August 2019. Throughout the series, the directing credits rotated between Daniel O'Hara and Jon Wright: O'Hara directed the first three episodes whereas Wright directed the second half. The programme was created by Joe Gilgun, who also portrayed the lead role of Vinnie O'Neill, and Danny Brocklehurst, who also wrote five episodes of the first series.

Brassic follows the lives of Vinnie (Gilgun) and his five friends as they live their lives in the fictional northern English town of Hawley. The working class group commit various crimes to keep money in their pockets, but as they get older some of them wonder if there's more to life away from the town. Michelle Keegan, Damien Molony, Tom Hanson, Aaron Heffernan, Ryan Sampson, Parth Thakerar, Bronagh Gallagher, Joanna Higson, Steve Evets and Dominic West co-star in supporting roles.

Cast
 Joe Gilgun as Vinnie O'Neill
 Michelle Keegan as Erin Croft
 Damien Molony as Dylan
 Tom Hanson as Cardi
 Aaron Heffernan as Ash Dennings
 Ryan Sampson as Tommo
 Parth Thakerar as JJ
 Steve Evets as Jim
 Dominic West as Dr Chris Cox
 Bronagh Gallagher as Carol
 Joanna Higson as Sugar

Episodes

Marketing
The series' official trailer was released by Sky One on 13 August 2019, and was shown on the network in the days prior to its premiere.

Release

Broadcast
Brassic debuted on Sky One on 22 August 2019.

Internationally, the programme has been aired in France, from 16 September; Spain, from 24 September through internet streaming; Germany, from 1 January 2020 through internet streaming; Australia from 25 February 2020, Canada, Russia and the United States. In Russia, it is titled as Без гроша.

Home media
All episodes are available to be viewed through the Sky Go and Amazon Video apps. The entire boxset is also available on NOW TV and Virgin Media in the United Kingdom.

On 27 August 2019, it was announced that the complete first series would release to DVD on 30 September.

Critical response
Series 1 of Brassic received general positive reviews from critics within the United Kingdom. Creator and lead actor Joe Gilgun has been praised for his performance as Vinny O'Neill, with review aggregator website Rotten Tomatoes commented, "Joseph Gilgun is wonderfully expressive as Vinnie, his volatile features continually scrunching together and apart like the top of a drawstring bag."

References

External links
 

2019 British television seasons
Television series set in 2019